My Life In Rooms is an album written by Barzin. It was released in 2006.

Track listing
 "Let's Go Driving" 3:58
 "So Much Time To Call My Own" 4:59
 "Leaving Time" 5:25
 "Just More Drugs" 3:21
 "Take This Blue" 4:31
 "Acoustic Guitar Phase" 4:28
 "Won't You Come" 3:29
 "Sometimes The Night..." 3:10
 "My Life In Rooms" 4:24

References

2006 albums
Barzin albums